Sheykh Maruf (also Romanized as Sheykh Ma‘rūf) is a village in Beygom Qaleh Rural District, in the Central District of Naqadeh County, West Azerbaijan Province, Iran. At the 2006 census, its population was 238, in 48 families.

References 

Populated places in Naqadeh County